Alvin Jacklick (born 1949) is a Marshallese politician and government minister. In the late 1980s he was elected mayor of Ebeye, at a time when he was described as a "young radical". He was involved in the projects of the Kwajalein Atoll Development Corporation. Jacklick was the Speaker of Nitijela, the Marshallese Parliament, from 2010 to 2011.

In the 2015 general election Jacklick was elected to the Legislature of the Marshall Islands for Kwajalein. In January 2016 he was narrowly defeated in his bid for the Presidency of the Marshall Islands by Casten Nemra by a 17–16 vote.

He has also been involved with diplomatic relations with Taiwan. He was Foreign Minister from 2000 to 2001. In 2014 he was one of the outspoken Marshallese senators against the nomination of an ex-Lebanese general as envoy to UNESCO.

References

1949 births
Living people
Foreign Ministers of the Marshall Islands
Government ministers of the Marshall Islands
Marshallese politicians
Mayors of places in the Marshall Islands
Members of the Legislature of the Marshall Islands
Speakers of the Legislature of the Marshall Islands
People from the Ralik Chain